Øystein Bjørn Blix (born 5 November 1966 in Tromsø, Norway) is a Norwegian Jazz musician (trombone) and sound designer, central to the Tromsø Jazz scene and Head of Tromsø Jazzklubb from 2001.

Career
Blix is a graduate of the Jazz Program at Trondheim Musikkonservatorium (1988). He was first recognized as trombonist in the band "Jazz i Nord" together with Jørn Øien (piano), Konrad Kaspersen (double bass) and Trond Sverre Hansen (drums) releasing the album Song, Fall Soft featuring Marit Sandvik (vocals) in 1997. He has led the trio "Pentateuch" expanding to the quartet "Blix Band" in 1990. They released the album På en lyserød sky (1997), including Niels Præstholm (double bass), Nils-Olav Johansen (guitar) and Tor Haugerud (drums). It was followed up with the album Texas (1998), where Didrik Ingvaldsen contributed on trumpet. He toured in the period 1999–2003 together with the trumpeter Gustavo Bergalli, within the band "Blix/Bergalli Group" comprising additional Jan Gunnar Hoff (piano), Sigurd Ulveseth (bass) and Magnus Gran (drums).

In 2002 we find Blix in a duo "Tromsø Kunstforsyning" performing contemporary music together with the celloist Bernt Simen Lund documented on the album Tur (2009). Otherwise, he has participated on the Tromsø elektronika-miljø scene, with such as Gaute Barlindhaug (alias "Kolar Goi") (Kolar Goi, 2003).

Blix works as Assistant Professor at the University of Tromsø, department of fine arts, where he lectures in acoustics. He is also director of the record company Reflect.

Honors
NOMUS scholarship, 1999 & 2002
Norwegian Government Travel and Study Grants, 1994, 2001 & 2005
Torgeir Stubøs Avard for special effort for the jazz in Northern Norway (Stubøprisen), 2003
Tromsø Municipality Cultural Grant, 2004.

Discography

Solo projects
1996: På en lyserød sky (NorCD), Blix Band
1998: Texas (NorCD), within Blix Band
2010: Pinseria (NorCD), Blix Band

Collaborative works
1997: Song, Fall Soft (Gemini Records), with Marit Sandvik
1999: Casamance (TKCD), with Tamba Kounda
2003: Kolar Goi (Beatservice Records), with Kolar Goi
2005: Aline Sitoe (King Snake), with Tamba Kounda
2007: June 1999 (Reflect), with Alf Kjellman
2008: Feather, But No Wings (Reflect), with Alf Kjellman
2009: Tur (NorCD), within "Tromsø Kunstforsyning"

Theatre and film
1997: Nakkeknekk (Totalteatret)
1999: Englepels (Totalteatret), was filmed in 2000
2003: Søstre (Haugen Produksjoner)
2004: Berøre (Stein Elvestad/Per Bogstad Gulliksen)
2005: Kaffebønneslekten (Stein Elvestad/Trine H. Blixrud)
2005: Søstre (Haugen Produksjoner/Riksteatret)

References

External links

Blixband at NorCD
The Record Company Reflect

20th-century Norwegian trombonists
21st-century Norwegian trombonists
Norwegian jazz trombonists
Male trombonists
Norwegian jazz composers
Norwegian University of Science and Technology alumni
Musicians from Tromsø
Living people
1966 births
21st-century trombonists
Male jazz composers
20th-century Norwegian male musicians
21st-century Norwegian male musicians